Boombastic is the third studio album released by Jamaican artist Shaggy. The album was released on July 11, 1995.

The album spawned five singles: "In the Summertime", a remake of the Mungo Jerry hit, "Boombastic", which peaked at number 1 on the UK Singles Chart, at 3 on the Billboard Hot 100 and at number 1 on the U.S. R&B chart,  "Why You Treat Me So Bad", the double A-side "Something Different" / "The Train Is Coming", and "Day Oh", which was released as a Japanese only single. "Boombastic" was used as the theme for a 1995 Levi's ad, which was directed by Michael Mort and Deiniol Morris. It was also used in the 2006 and 2007 films, respectively, Barnyard and Mr. Bean's Holiday. A remake of "In the Summertime" was re-released for the 1996 film Flipper.

Charts and awards
The album won the Grammy Award for Best Reggae Album.

The album was certified platinum in United States and gold in United Kingdom. It peaked at number 34 on the Billboard 200 and topped the 'Top Reggae Albums' chart in the US, and reached number 37 on the UK Albums Chart.

Track listing 
 "In the Summertime" (featuring Rayvon) (Ray Dorset) – 3:57
 "Boombastic" (Burrell, Floyd, Livingston) – 4:07
 "Something Different" (featuring Wayne Wonder) (Burrell, Charles, Kelly) – 4:31
 "Forgive Them Father" (Burrell, Crosdale, Dennis) – 3:27
 "Heartbreak Suzie" (featuring Gold Mine) (Burrell, Hawthorne) – 4:09
 "Finger Smith" (Burrell, Crosdale, Dennis) – 3:28
 "Why You Treat Me So Bad" (featuring Grand Puba) (Burrell, Dixon, Livingston) – 3:47
 "Woman a Pressure Me" (Burrell, Crosdale, Dennis) – 3:41
 "The Train Is Coming" (featuring Ken Boothe) (Boothe, Burrell, Livingston) – 3:41
 "Island Lover" (Burrell, Livingston, Zapata) – 4:13
 "Day Oh" (Attaway, Burgie) – 3:56
 "Jenny" (featuring Budda Junky Swan) (Benoiti, Burrel, Pizzonia) – 4:15
 "How Much More" (Burrell, Kelly) – 3:51
 "Gal Yu a Pepper" (Burrell, Halliburton) – 4:18

 US Bonus Tracks
 15. "In the Summertime" (Rayvon & The Ripper Remix) - 4:04
 16. "Boombastic" (Sting Remix) - 4:14

Personnel 
 Les King – Engineer
 John Raf Allen – Tracking
 Ken Boothe – Performer
 Kent Bryan – Background Vocals, Tracking
 Jake Chessum – Photography
 Gemma Corfield – Executive Producer
 Paul Crosdale – Tracking
 Duley Culture – Background Vocals
 Bobby "Digital" Dixon – Producer, Engineer
 Bobby Dixon – Producer, Engineer
 Tom Dolan – Art Direction, Design
 Brian & Tony Gold – Background Vocals
 Grand Puba – Performer
 Anastas Hackett – Tracking
 Dennis Halliburton – Engineer, Mixing, Tracking
 Tony Kelly – Producer, Engineer, Tracking
 Marty Kersich – Horn Overdubs
 Robert Livingston – Producer, Executive Producer, Tracking
 Lynford "Fatta" Marshall – Mixing
 George "Dusty" Miller – Tracking
 Kimbalyn Miller – Background Vocals
 Dr. Marshall Murphey – Engineer, Background Vocals, Overdubs, Mixing
 Robert Murphy – Engineer, Mixing
 Wayne Nicholson – Engineer
 Shaun "Sting Int'l" Pizzonia – Background Vocals, Producer, Engineer, Overdubs, Mixing
 Rayvon – Performer
 Glen Ricks – Background Vocals
 Wayne Wonder – Performer
 Collin "Bulbie" York – Mixing
 Robert Zapata – Background Vocals, Producer, Tracking

Charts

Weekly charts

Year-end charts

Certifications and sales

References 

1995 albums
Shaggy (musician) albums
Grammy Award for Best Reggae Album